Thompson House is a historic house on N. Country Road in Setauket, Suffolk County, New York.  It was built in 1709 and is a saltbox form dwelling.  It is a rectangular, timber frame two story building with a one-story wing.  It features a steeply pitched, asymmetrical gable roof with a central brick chimney.

It was added to the National Register of Historic Places in 1988.

References

External links

Thompson House - official site at Society for the Preservation of Long Island Antiquities

Houses on the National Register of Historic Places in New York (state)
Houses completed in 1709
Houses in Suffolk County, New York
1709 establishments in the Province of New York
National Register of Historic Places in Suffolk County, New York